The Man from Niger or Forbidden Love (French: L'homme du Niger) is a 1940 French drama film directed by Jacques de Baroncelli and starring Victor Francen, Jacques Dumesnil and Annie Ducaux. It is set in the French colonial empire.

The film's sets were designed by the art director Guy de Gastyne and Robert Gys. It was shot at the Saint-Maurice Studios in Paris and on location in Mali, then known as French Sudan.

Main cast
 Victor Francen as Le commandant Bréval  
 Jacques Dumesnil as Le lieutenant Jacques Parent  
 Annie Ducaux as Danièle Mourrier  
 Harry Baur as Le docteur Bourdet  
 Blanche Denège as Soeur Théoneste  
 Georges Mauloy as François Mourrier

References

Bibliography 
 Kennedy-Karpat, Colleen. Rogues, Romance, and Exoticism in French Cinema of the 1930s. Fairleigh Dickinson, 2013.

External links 
 

1940 films
French drama films
1940 drama films
1940s French-language films
Films directed by Jacques de Baroncelli
Films set in Africa
French black-and-white films
1940s French films

fr:L'homme du Niger